Iuliia Vladimirovna Andreeva (née Arkhipova born 7 March 1981) is a Kyrgyzstani long-distance runner. She competed in the marathon at the 2008, 2012 and 2016 Olympics and placed 58th–59th. She has qualified for the 2020 Summer Olympics in the women's marathon event.

She is married to and is coached by the Olympic marathon runner Grigoriy Andreyev, they have one daughter.

References

External links
 

1981 births
Living people
Sportspeople from Bishkek
Kyrgyzstani people of Russian descent
Kyrgyzstani female marathon runners
Kyrgyzstani female long-distance runners
Olympic athletes of Kyrgyzstan
Athletes (track and field) at the 2008 Summer Olympics
Athletes (track and field) at the 2012 Summer Olympics
Athletes (track and field) at the 2016 Summer Olympics
Athletes (track and field) at the 2010 Asian Games
Athletes (track and field) at the 2014 Asian Games
World Athletics Championships athletes for Kyrgyzstan
Asian Games competitors for Kyrgyzstan